Maria Lucia Heiberg Rosenberg (born 9 February 1984) is a Danish singer and musical-performer. She became famous when she won a record contract with the label EMI in the TV 2-program Popstars in 2003. Her debut single "Taking Back My Heart" (2004) was no. 1 on hitlisten. The album That's Just Me sold 22.0000 copies.

Career 
She has been singing since age 8 when she started her music career with a minor role in Bugsy Malone. Her father was Per Rosenberg (d. in 2009), an elementary school teacher. Her mother is Karin Heiberg Christensen, a film editor.

Her Danish maternal grandfather, Poul Heiberg Christensen (1918–2010) was director of SAS, consul of Denmark in Munich and opponent. He was appointed Knight of the Order of the Dannebrog, First Class. Her maternal grandmother, Lucya, was Polish.

She sang some time in the band "Rosenberg," whose driving force is her father. The family home where she grew up is located in Risskov.

Maria Lucia created a career as a musical singer with leading parts in Skønheden og udyret (English: Beauty and the Beast) on the Det Ny Teater, Aladdin in Fredericia Teater (later on Copenhagen Opera House in Copenhagen) and West Side Story on Gasværket. On 8 May 2011 she was awarded Reumertprisen as singer of the year for her role in Wicked (one of two non-replicated versions of the show) on Det Ny Teater, the first musical performer to receive this prize.

She participated in the TV show Vild med Dans in 2013 and danced with Morten Kjeldgaard. In 2013 she also dubbed Elsa for the Disney film Frozen, performing the Danish version of the song "Let it go" ("Lad det ske"), which won an Oscar on 2 March 2014. Rosenberg was chosen for the part also because she played the role of Elphaba in Wicked, which in the Broadway-version was originally played by Idina Menzel, who voices Elsa in original version. Between 2011 and 2014 Danmarks Radio held a series of concerts in different locations in Denmark where famous Disney songs were performed by DR UnderholdningsOrkestret, DR VokalEnsemblet and artists such as Stig Rossen, Annette Heick, Henrik Launbjerg, Monique, Jesper Asholt, Thomas Meilstrup and Pelle Emil Hebsgaard.

Since 2017, her partner has been the Swedish singer and producer Albin Fredy Ljungqvist. They live in Vesterbro. Their son, Per Albin Fredy, was born on 27 June 2020 at Rigshospitalet.

On 9 February 2020, her birthday, Maria Lucia was called to join Idina Menzel, Aurora and eight more of Elsa's international dubbers to perform the song “Into the Unknown” during the 92nd Academy Awards while being pregnant with Per. Every international performer sang one line of the song in a different language: Maria Lucia in Danish, Willemijn Verkaik in German, Takako Matsu in Japanese, Carmen Sarahí in Latin American Spanish, Lisa Stokke in Norwegian, Kasia Łaska in Polish, Anna Buturlina in Russian, Gisela in European Spanish and Gam Wichayanee in Thai.

Theatre

Filmography

Awards 
 Prince Joachim and Princess Alexandra Foundation Award (2007).
 Reumertprisen (2011).
 Theatre Cup (2015).

References

External links 
 
 

1984 births
Singers from Aarhus
21st-century Danish  women singers
Living people